Karl Menninger (October 6, 1898 – October 2, 1963) was a German teacher of and writer about mathematics.  His major work was Zahlwort und Ziffer (1934,; English trans., Number Words and Number Symbols), about non-academic mathematics in much of the world.  (The omission of Africa was rectified by Claudia Zaslavsky in her book Africa Counts.)

References

Dauben, Joseph Warren, and Christoph Scriba, eds. (2002), Writing the History of Mathematics, Birkhäuser, Basel, page 483.
Menninger, Karl (1934), Zahlwort und Ziffer.  Revised edition (1958).  Göttingen: Vandenhoeck and Ruprecht.
Menninger, Karl (1969), Number Words and Number Symbols.  Cambridge, Mass.: The M.I.T. Press.

German historians of mathematics
Ethnomathematicians
20th-century German mathematicians
1898 births
1963 deaths